Knuts Skujenieks (5 September 1936 – 25 July 2022) was a Latvian poet, journalist, and translator from fifteen European languages.

He spent his childhood near Bauska in Zemgale. Skujenieks later studied at University of Latvia in Riga and at the Maxim Gorky Literature Institute in Moscow.

In 1962, he was convicted of anti-Soviet activities, and sentenced to seven years in a prison camp in Mordovia, Russia. Although he was a prolific poet, his first collection was only published in 1978. The poems he wrote during his captivity were published in 1990. Skujenieks' poetry has been translated into many European languages.  Books of his poetry have been published in Sweden and Ukraine. In 2008 he was awarded the Baltic Assembly Prize for Literature.

In 2015, Film Director Ivars Tontegode was shooting a biographical documentary feature Knutification/Nepareizais about the life of Knuts Skujenieks.

Bibliography
Lirika un balsis (Lyrics and Voices; Riga, Liesma Publ., 1978)
Iesien baltā lakatiņā (Tie it into a White Cloth; Riga, Liesma Publ., 1986)
Sēkla sniegā (Seed in the Snow; Riga, Liesma Publ., 1990)

References

1936 births
2022 deaths
Writers from Riga
20th-century Latvian poets
Translators to Latvian
University of Latvia alumni
Latvian translators
Latvian journalists
Soviet dissidents
20th-century translators
Recipients of the Cross of Recognition
Officer's Crosses of the Order of the Lithuanian Grand Duke Gediminas
Latvian male poets
20th-century male writers
Maxim Gorky Literature Institute alumni